Ill is the third studio album by Swedish post punk band Makthaverskan. It was released on 20 October 2017 through Luxury Recordings in Sweden and Run for Cover Records everywhere else.

Track listing

References

2017 albums
Run for Cover Records albums